Mary Newman may refer to:

 Mary B. Newman (1909–1995), American politician and state government official
 Mary Ann Newman, translator, editor and writer on Catalan culture